Century Park is the biggest park in the city of Shanghai. It is situated on Jinxiu Road, in the Pudong New Area of Shanghai, nearby to the Shanghai Science and Technology Museum.

Century Park focuses on lawns, woods, and lakes. The park was designed by the British environmental consultancy LUC and was built in four years from 1996 to 2000. It got its name because it is situated at the end of Century Avenue. Its construction was completed in 2000, the starting point of the new century. The park is known as "Holiday Park" because it is both modern and natural. Numerous different facilities are provided for tourists in the park. They can feed pigeons, go fishing, row a boat, peddle a bicycle, or have fun in the green maze.

Century Park sprawls  and lies to the south of Century Boulevard (世纪大道).

Century Park is divided into seven parts, including the Lakeside Scenic Area, the Forest Landscape Area, the Amenity Grass, the Nature Reserve, the Folk Village, the Exotic Zone, and the Mini Golf Course. There are eight entrances in total, and five of them are open to the public: Gate 1 at the end of Century Avenue, Gate 2 at the crossroad of Jinxiu Road and Minsheng Road, Gate 3 at the crossroad of Jinxiu Road and Jinsong Road, Gate 5 at the crossroad of Huamu Road and Fangdian Road, and Gate 7 at the intersection of Huamu Road and Yinghua Road.

Features
The park includes a concert stage, and visitors can hire tandem bicycles or cycling-cars to travel through it. The park's landscaping combines British, Japanese, and Chinese gardening styles. Well known places in Century Park include The Lucky Pond, Bird island, and the lotus pond.

Lakeside Scenic Area
The major attractions in this area include the Century Clock, Mirror Lake, and the Green World Relief Sculpture Wall.

Century Clock is a symbolic scenic spot in Century Park. The three hands of the clock are white, and the twelve graduations are made of Chinese little leaf boxes. Beautiful flowers are arranged around the clock, making it colorful and delicate. The Century Clock is controlled from a satellite, with an error of less than 0.03 second. Thus, it is of high artistic, scientific, and practical value.

Mirror Park, located in the west of the park, is the largest artificial lake in Shanghai. To the east of the lake is a water lock which controls the water level. Mirror Lake is blue and clean, with the blue sky and white clouds reflected in it. Standing on the wharf by the lake, tourists can see the Lujiazui Financial and Trade Zone in the distance.

Green World Relief Sculpture Wall presents 29 species of animals and plants from the Asian-Pacific Region. It covers a total area of 213 square yards (178 square meters), and measures  in length. The animals include China pandas, elephants from Thailand, buffalos from Vietnam, Australian kangaroos, American eagles, and Russian bears. The plants, which vary from tropical plants, semi-tropical plants, temperate plants, to frigid ones, show that creatures adapt themselves to the environment.

Forest Landscape Area
The main attraction here is the Open-air Music Square. It is situated in the west of Century Park. The square covers a total area of 2 acres (8,000 square meters), with a seating capacity of 2,500 people. This is the largest artificial open-air music square in China.

Amenity Grass
Located in the south of the park, the Amenity Grass is characterized by soft green grass, dotted with European-style buildings with red roof tiles. The Spring Garden, Summer Garden, Autumn Garden, and Winter Garden present tourists with the beauty of all the seasons. Additionally, there is a clear stream flowing by.

Nature Reserve
This consists mainly of Birds' Island and the Montreal Garden.

More than 100 magpies are bred here. Moreover, there are more than 50 species of trees on the island, such as peach trees, plum blossom trees, and camphor trees. The tranquil island and the lively birds are in perfect harmony with each other. Tourists will relax and delight in the lovely scenery.

The construction of the park was sponsored by the Canadian Government, the Quebec Provincial Government, and the Montreal Municipal Government, hence its name. The garden is intended to show the harmony among men, nature, science and technology, which is cherished by both Chinese and Canadian people.

Folk Village
Passing through Gate 3, tourists will see the Folk Village in the northeast of the park. The white beach by the limpid lake is surrounded with tall palm trees. Broad Ginkgo Avenue leads to the village. On either side of the avenue are exuberant ginkgo trees which are dozens of years old. In a word, the area brims a fresh pure atmosphere, making tourists comfortable and relaxed.

Exotic Zone
The highlight of the Exotic Zone lies in the Olmec Colossal Head in the southeast of the Century Park. It was presented to the Shanghai Municipal Government by the Veracruz State Government of Mexico. It is a copy of the eighth original Olmec Head of Mexico. As an embodiment of Mexican civilization, the Olmec culture is characterized by its outstanding carving. The head-shaped stone carving is the well-known piece, and features thick lips, big eyes, and a square face.

Plum Blossom Show
The park has a long history of hosting the Plum Blossom Show. At the beginning, some potted plum blossoms were displayed in the Montreal Garden Scenic Area during the Chinese New Year (Spring Festival). That was a small-scale exhibition. Nowadays, there are more than 3,000 plum blossom trees in the park. It is the largest plum blossom woods in Shanghai. Local people as well as tourists often come to the park to enjoy the beautiful and fragrant plum blossoms in winter and spring.

Transportation
Century Park is best reached by taking Line 2 on the Shanghai Metro to Century Park station. It is also within walking distance from Shanghai Science and Technology Museum station and Kerry Center Pudong. Entrance to the park costs 10 Yuan, although prices are raised during the 'golden week' holiday periods.

The Huamu Road station of Line 7 of the Shanghai Metro is across the corner from Century Park's #5 entrance.

References

Parks in Shanghai
Urban public parks
Pudong